Denis O'Connor (7 January 1917 - 29 February 2004), known as Din Connors, was an Irish Gaelic footballer who played for club sides Dromtarriffe and Millstreet and at inter-county level with the Cork and New York senior football teams.

Career

Connors first came to prominence as a Gaelic footballer with Dromtarriffe. His performances for the club saw him called up to the Cork minor team for the 1935 Munster Minor Championship. Such was his performance in the underage grade that Connors was immediately drafted onto the Cork junior team, winning a Munster Junior Championship as a substitute in 1940. He joined the senior team the following year but was an unused substitute. Connors claimed his first senior silverware in 1943 when Cork won the Munster Senior Championship for the first time in 15 years. He won a second provincial title two years later before ending the season by lining out at left wing-back when Cork claimed the All-Ireland title after a defeat of Cavan in the final. Connors played his last game for Cork in 1948, however, his emigration to the United States saw him line out with the New York senior team. He won a National League title after a defeat of Cavan in 1950.

Death

Connors died in Braintree, Massachusetts on 29 February 2004.

Honours

Millstreet
Cork Senior Football Championship: 1948

Cork
All-Ireland Senior Football Championship: 1945 
Munster Senior Football Championship: 1943, 1945
Munster Junior Football Championship: 1940 

New York
National Football League: 1949-50

References

1917 births
2004 deaths
Dromtarriffe Gaelic footballers
Millstreet Gaelic footballers
Cork inter-county Gaelic footballers
New York inter-county Gaelic footballers
Munster inter-provincial Gaelic footballers
Winners of one All-Ireland medal (Gaelic football)